Amirah Kassem (born January 8, 1987) is an American-born baker, author, designer and media personality. She is best known as the owner and founder of FLOUR SHOP and a judge on the Disney+ food-art series Foodtastic. Her kitchen, table, home and clothing products are sold worldwide.

Amirah specializes in sculpting custom cakes without the use of fondant and is also known for her "Explosion Cake."  Her Cara the Unicorn Explosion Cake was featured as Instagram's most memorable trend of 2017. She is also the best-selling author of The Power of Sprinkles: A Cake Book and children's titles The Magical Land of Birthdays series and board-book Bake a Rainbow Cake!

Early life and education

Amirah grew up in Chihuahua, Mexico where she learned to bake from her mother and grandmother. She moved back to her birthplace of El Paso, Texas at the age of 9 with her parents. Later on, she attended the Fashion Institute of Design & Merchandising in LA.

Career

Flour Shop 

In 2012 Amirah Kassem left the fashion industry to set up a high-concept bakery, Flour Shop. This is known for unusually-shaped cakes in the shapes of cheeseburgers, pizzas, buckets of popcorn and the well-known 'Explosion Cake'. The company specializes in creating baked goods without the use of fondant icing.

Flour Shop opened their Flagship Store in SoHo New York in November 2017 and in Beverly Hills, California in August 2020. Her clients have included Kim Kardashian, Katy Perry and Beyonce, as well as brands likes Vans, Louis Vuitton, and Alice + Olivia.

Amirah has headlined food festivals like BottleRock, Food and Wine Festival, New York City Wine and Food Festival and Catskills Festival.

Television 
Amirah will be starring as a judge in the upcoming Disney+ food-art series Foodtastic. The show is set to air later in 2021 and is hosted by Keke Palmer. She has also frequently been featured as a guest judge on many food shows including: Sugar Rush, Cupcake Championship, Nailed It! Mexico, Beat Bobby Flay, Cake My Day and Top Elf.

Books 
Amirah has released a cookbook, two children's fiction books, a board book and a calendar. Her cake book, The Power of Sprinkles, reached #1 on Amazon in Celebrity & TV Show Cookbooks and Cake Baking Books and peaked at #57 in Books on the Amazon Best Sellers Rank.

Her middle grade series, The Magical Land of Birthdays, follows a ten-year-old Amirah as she receives a magical cookbook. Amirah is transported to the Magical Land of Birthdays, where she meets three of her birthday buddies from different corners of the world—kids who share her exact birthday and are also about to turn 11. Amirah also coined the term "b-buds" (short for birthday buddies) for this series, which refers to anyone that shares the same birthday.

Press 
Amirah and her products have been featured on the cover of Bon Appétit, Refinery29, Food & Wine, and other publications.  She has also made many guest appearances on television, including TODAY, The Tonight Show starring Jimmy Fallon, Late Night with Seth Meyers. The Rachael Ray Show, The Drew Barrymore Show and Home & Family.

Art 

Amirah Kassem works frequently on collaborations with photographer Henry Hargreaves. Their work includes “Burning Calories” photo series, which is in a gallery in Venice, Italy as of November 2013. Kassem and Hargreaves also collaborated on a photo series in celebration of the Wu Tang Clan's 20th anniversary for the Wu Tang Brand.

Amirah's work has also been featured in the Whitney Museum and Brooklyn Museum. In 2015, When the Brooklyn Museum celebrated Takashi Murakami, Amirah used 10,000 gumballs to create her own art installation, reinterpreting the Murakami flower.

Design 

In 2019, Amirah designed and launched a world-wide kitchen, table and food collection with Williams-Sonoma. Her line of FLOUR SHOP kitchen and table wares was called "playful and chic" as well as a "refined rainbow" by Elle Decor.

In late 2019, Amirah also designed and launched a home collection with Pottery Barn brands, mostly focusing on Pottery Barn Kids. The FLOUR SHOP collection was sold world-wide and included decor, bedding and tabletop items.

In 2020, Amirah designed and launched a Vans limited edition fashion line in both footwear and clothing. The FLOUR SHOP collection spans kids, women and men departments in footwear, clothing and accessories.

Fashion 

Amirah Kassem began her career in fashion while attending FIDM. She started out working for 7 For All Mankind and Fred Segal. Eventually Kassem moved her way into high fashion through experiences at Interview Magazine and Karl Templer. She then moved to NYC, where she worked alongside Johan Lindeberg in the launch of BLKDNM.

Personal life 
Kassem currently resides in Los Angeles with her husband and business partner, Ross "The Boss" Harrow. They have a baby girl named Coco.

External links 
 Flour Shop

References

Confectioners
Living people
Businesspeople from New York City
American bakers
1987 births